The African Protestant Church was established by American Presbyterian missionaries in Cameroon. In 1921 the mission opened a Bible School, the Dager School of Theology, to train African leaders of the church. In 1934 a group was separated from this body. After several name changes it adopted the name Africa Protestant Church. Originally it has concentrated in the Lolodorf region, but spread other parts of the country. In 2006 it had 10,000 members and 32 congregations. It has the School of Theology Abraham Nzie Nzouango to train pastors and church officers. It is a member of the World Communion of Reformed Churches and the World Council of Churches.

References 

Members of the World Communion of Reformed Churches
Reformed denominations in Africa
Protestantism in Cameroon
Christian organizations established in 1934
1934 establishments in the French colonial empire